is a former Japanese female football player. She played for the Japan's national team in 1981.

Biography
Ohara was born in Ise, Mie Prefecture in 1957. On September 9, 1981, she debuted for Japan national team against Italy. However Japan was defeated this match by a score of 0–9. This is the biggest defeat in the history of Japan national team. The match was the sole match she played in as part of the national team.

National team statistics

References

1957 births
Living people
Jissen Women's University alumni
Association football people from Mie Prefecture
Japanese women's footballers
Japan women's international footballers
Women's association football midfielders